Novomikhaylovka is a rural locality (a village) in Deniskinsky Selsoviet, Fyodorovsky District, Bashkortostan, Russia. The population was 64 as of 2010. There is 1 street.

Geography 
Novomikhaylovka is located 20 km southwest of Fyodorovka (the district's administrative centre) by road. Noaya Derevnya is the nearest rural locality.

References 

Rural localities in Fyodorovsky District